The Wilderness is a historic estate at 13954 Deerfield Road in rural Bath County, Virginia, United States. In 1771, the Crown conveyed the land to brothers Sampson Mathews and George Mathews. The main house, a seven-bay brick Georgian structure, was built about 1816 for Samuel Blackburn, a prominent local farmer and politician, who was son-in-law to George Mathews. The property also includes a brick carriage house from the same period, a rarity in such a remote rural setting.

The property was listed on the National Register of Historic Places in 2017.

See also
National Register of Historic Places listings in Bath County, Virginia

References

Houses on the National Register of Historic Places in Virginia
Georgian architecture in Virginia
Houses completed in 1816
Houses in Bath County, Virginia
National Register of Historic Places in Bath County, Virginia
1816 establishments in Virginia